Adrián Guillermo Sánchez (born 14 May 1999) is an Argentine footballer playing as a midfielder for Curicó Unido, on loan from Boca Juniors.

Career statistics

Club

Notes

References

1999 births
Living people
Argentine footballers
Association football midfielders
Uruguayan Primera División players
Boca Juniors footballers
Cerro Largo F.C. players
Sportspeople from Buenos Aires Province